Milton Jackson (real name Barry Christie) is a DJ, record producer, and DJ Awards winner, specializing in Deep house. He is from Glasgow, Scotland.

Discography

Studio albums
2002 The Bionic Boy
2009 Crash

Studio singles / EPs
2001 The Rhythm EP
2001 "Sunlight" (12")
2003 Jaded EP (12")
2006 "Future Fresh" (12")
2006 I Want It EP (12")
2006 "Special Powers" (12")
2006 "Tech No" (12")
2006 The Evil Theme EP (12")
2006 "Rogue Element" (12")
2007 "Cycles" (12")
2008 "Ghosts in My Machines" (12")
2009 "Crash / Rhythm Track" (12")
2010 "Breathe" (12")
2012 "Lessons Learned EP" (12")
2012 "Sub Rosa" (12" Ltd)
2015 "Your Love" (12")

External links
Milton's discography

Milton's biography on artists' page on Freerange Records site
Masterclass on the production of his title "Ghosts in My Machines"

Scottish record producers
Living people
Year of birth missing (living people)